Lester Christopher Hearden (April 24, 1902 – December 25, 1978) was an American football halfback for the Green Bay Packers of the National Football League (NFL). He played college football for Marquette and St. Ambrose.

Biography
Hearden was born in Lawrence, Wisconsin. Hearden played for the Green Bay Packers in 1924. He played at the collegiate level at Marquette University and Saint Ambrose University.

See also
Green Bay Packers players

References

1902 births
1978 deaths
People from Brown County, Wisconsin
Players of American football from Wisconsin
American football halfbacks
Marquette Golden Avalanche football players
St. Ambrose Fighting Bees football players
Green Bay Packers players
Green Bay East High School alumni